Lil' Monster, known as  in Japan, is a video game for the Game Boy Color handheld, published by Agetec. The game entailed players to train small monsters used for training and battling, while also collecting gems to help you, as the main character, in your quest to battle Cool Joe who has become infamous for his evil deeds all across the land.

References
 GameFAQs

1999 video games
Agetec games
Game Boy Color games
Game Boy Color-only games
KID games
Single-player video games
Video games developed in Japan